Frank Reginald Peters (26 February 1910 – 1990) was an English footballer who played as an outside right. He was born in Birmingham. He made over 240 Football League appearances in the years before the Second World War.

Career
Peters played locally for Wellington St George's. He initially joined Coventry City but failed to make a first team appearance. Peters moved to Charlton Athletic in July 1930. He had a short spell with Fulham. Peters joined Swindon Town in July 1933. Bob Hewison signed Peters in May 1936 from Swindon Town for Bristol City. Like so many other players Peters ended his football career on the outbreak of the Second World War.

Honours
with Bristol City
Football League Third Division South runners up: 1937–38

References

1910 births
1990 deaths
Footballers from Birmingham, West Midlands
English footballers
Association football outside forwards
Coventry City F.C. players
Wellington St George's F.C. players
Charlton Athletic F.C. players
Fulham F.C. players
Swindon Town F.C. players
Bristol City F.C. players
English Football League players